Carleton Wiggins NA (1848–1932) was an American landscape and cattle painter.  He was born in Turner, Orange County, New York, and studied in New York at the National Academy of Design and with George Inness, and in Paris, and settled in New York.  His landscapes were executed in broad flowing lines, with a rich low-toned color scheme, and often contain cattle, solidly and realistically portrayed.

Biography
He was born in 1848. Wiggins frequented the Old Lyme Art Colony along with his son, painter Guy Carleton Wiggins, and was elected to the National Academy of Design in 1906.  He died in 1932.

Paintings
 "Young Holstein Bull" (Metropolitan Museum, New York)
 "Cattle in Pond" (Brooklyn Museum)
 "Sheep and Landscape" (Brooklyn Museum)
 "Lake and Mountains" (Art Institute, Chicago)
 "Moonrise on the Lake" (Art Institute, Chicago)
 "October" (Corcoran Art Gallery, Washington)
 "Evening after a Shower" (National Gallery, Washington)
 "The Plow Horse" (Lotos Club, New York)

References

External links 
'A Family of Painters is Having Its Moment', Ann Farmer, The New York Times, 6 June 2011
 Biographical Notes, a collection of biographical information and images of 50 American artists, containing information about the artist on page 52.

Painters from New York City
19th-century American painters
American male painters
20th-century American painters
American landscape painters
1848 births
1932 deaths
National Academy of Design members
19th-century American male artists
20th-century American male artists